The Fox Sister is a Korean story about the mythical Korean nine-tailed fox demon (kumiho).

Synopsis

A man had three sons and no daughter.  He prayed for a daughter, even if she was a fox.  His wife gave birth to a daughter, but when the girl was six, one of their cows would die every night.  One night, he sent his oldest son to watch.  The boy watched and told him that his sister did it, by pulling the liver out of the cow and eating it.  His father accused him of having fallen asleep and having a nightmare and threw his son out.  Next, the second son was sent to watch over the cows, and nothing happened until the moon was full again. Then, the sister struck, and the second son was also thrown out for reporting this. Following this, the youngest son was sent to watch; he claimed that their sister had gone to the outhouse and that the cows must have died from seeing the moon.

The older brothers wandered until they met a Buddhist monk, who sent them back with four magical bottles: a yellow one, a white one, a blue one, and a red one.  Once they arrived, they found their sister living alone; she told them their parents and brother had passed away and implored them to stay.  Finally, she persuaded them to stay the night and somehow made a rich meal for them.  In the night, the older and second brother was woken by weird sounds. They rolled over, saw the meal, and realized that they had eaten corpses of the people.  They even saw their sister, and she was plan to eat them. She told them that she only needed two more to become a human.

They fled, throwing the yellow bottle behind them, and it became a mountain of boulders. As a fox, she climb over it. They throw the white bottle behind them, it became a thicket of thorns to trap her. but as a fox, she made her way through it.  They threw the blue bottle behind them and trapped her in a river, but as a fox, she swam ashore.  Lastly, they threw the red bottle behind them, and she was trapped in a fire.  It burned her into a crisp until she was no more than a mosquito.

Adaptations

The folk tale has inspired, among other works, the webcomic The Fox Sister.

References

Buddhist folklore
Female characters in fairy tales
Korean fairy tales
Fiction about shapeshifting